The Market Square, Wrocław is a medieval market square in Wrocław, in southwestern Poland. The square is rectangular with the dimensions  and now serves as a pedestrian zone. It is one of the largest market squares in Europe, with the largest two city halls in the country.

The buildings around the square are built according to different styles: the middle part (German: Tritt) of the ring is occupied by a block of buildings consisting of the Old City Hall, the New City Hall as well as numerous citizens' houses. The market square is an urban ensemble with the two diagonally contiguous areas, the Salt Market and the square in front of St. Elisabeth's Church. Eleven streets lead to the market: two to each corner, two narrow lanes and an opened outside square, Kurzy Targ "Chicken Market".

The market was founded according to Magdeburg law as early as the rule of Polish Duke Henry I the Bearded between 1214 and 1232. Over time, the patricians' houses appeared and by the middle of the 14th century they had formed a closed construction with the limits of the plots defined.

In the 19th century the square was connected to the tram lines, at first a horse-drawn system, but after 1892 electric.

During World War II, the market square was damaged, however, most of the buildings remained intact and were carefully restored.

Through to the end of the 1970s, vehicles were able to drive through along an east–west axis. Between 1996 and 2000 the square was resurfaced, while the east side, the last to be accessible to cars, was pedestrianised.

There are now 60 numbered plots on the market square, with some buildings occupying several. The limits of the plots often follow lines different from those first laid out since estates were often merged and divided in the late Middle Ages. Each property has a traditional name, usually associated with the coat of arms visible on the facade or related to the history of the house itself, for instance Under the Griffins, Under the Blue Sun and Old Town Hall (tenement house, which collects the city council before the construction of the first town hall; now there is a McDonald).

Buildings on the middle square 

The inner block stands with an alignment which varies by 7° from that of the outline of the square and surrounding street plan. The reason for this variation has not been established conclusively.

A prominent element of the block is the late-Gothic Old City Hall, located on its southern side. The structure is one of the city's most recognisable landmarks, particularly for its distinctive eastern facade. To the Old Town Hall is adjacent New Town Hall, built in the years 1860–1864.

At the turn of the 19th and 20th century, two-thirds of buildings in the middle of the square, were demolished and replaced by offices and retail establishments designed in Historicism and Modern styles.

During the World War II although much of the city was destroyed or damaged, the market did not suffer much damage. The square was restored according to the way it looked in the late 18th century, using Baroque and Classicism styles.

In the buildings on the middle square there are three parallel small streets (Sukiennice, Przejście Żelaźnicze, Przejście Garncarskie) and one perpendicular to them (Zaułek Jerzego Grotowskiego).

East side 
The east side was historically known as the "Green Pipe Side", referring to the verdigris on the copper gutters and downpipes. Its name in Polish is Strona Zielonej Trzciny ("Green Reed Side"). Opposite the main facade of the Town Hall, the east side comprises the houses no. 29 through 41. Notable buildings include the old Barasch Brothers' Department Store, now Feniks Department Store (street no. 29-41).

West side 
In 1931, on the west side of the Market Square, at location tenement houses 9 to 11, architect Heinrich Rump designed a modernist and controversial high office building (now the Santander Bank Polska, formerly the seat of MPK Wrocław).

Notes

References
Olgierd Czerner, Rynek wrocławski, Wrocław: Ossolineum, 1976
Cezary Buśko, Archeologia lokacyjnego Wrocławia, in Rudolf Procházka: Forum urbes mediiaevi. 1.Sborník příspěvků z konference FUMA konané 10. dubna 2002, Brno: Archaia Brno, 2004, pp. 35–45. . PDF, Polish with German summary
 Dehio - Handbuch der Kunstdenkmäler in Polen: Schlesien, Herder-Institut Marburg and Krajowy Osrodek Badan i Dokumentacji Zabytkow Warszawa, Deutscher Kunstverlag 2005,

Gallery

See also
 Main Square, Kraków
 St Mary Magdalene Church, Wrocław
 Wrocław Old Town

External links 

 Christmas market
“Zdrój” Fountain The Official Travel Guide of Wrocław

Buildings and structures completed in the 13th century
Retail markets in Poland
Buildings and structures in Wrocław
Squares in Wrocław
Wrocław